To be sour is to evoke the taste that detects acidity.

Sour may also refer to:

Food and drink 
 Sour (cocktail), a traditional family of mixed drinks
 Souring, a cooking technique that uses exposure to an acid to effect a physical and chemical change in food
 Sour beer

Music 
 Sour (album), a 2021 album by Olivia Rodrigo
 Sour (band), an American band
 Sour, a 1994 album by Ours
 "Sour", a song by Limp Bizkit from their album Three Dollar Bill, Y'all

Places 
 Sours, a commune in northern France
 Sour, Algeria
 Tyre, Lebanon, occasionally romanized as Sour

Other 
 Sun of Unclouded Righteousness, a Christian hymn
 Sour (cannabis), a subset of Cannabis sativa-dominant Cannabis strains

See also

 Soeur (disambiguation), including Sœur and Söur
 SUR (disambiguation)
 Tart (disambiguation)